Georg Andersen (8 November 1893 – 1 January 1974) was a Norwegian footballer. He played in one match for the Norway national football team in 1913.

References

External links
 
 

1893 births
1974 deaths
Norwegian footballers
Norway international footballers
Association football midfielders